Christian Weber may refer to:

 Christian Friedrich Weber (1764–1831), German New Testament scholar
 Christian Weber (double bass player) (1972-), Swiss double bass player
 Christian Weber (footballer) (born 1983), German footballer
 Christian Weber (ice hockey) (born 1964), Swiss former hockey player, currently manager for EC KAC
 Christian Weber (SS general) (1883–1945), German Nazi Party official and Schutzstaffel Brigadeführer

See also
 Weber–Christian disease, a cutaneous condition